Colgan is an unincorporated community in Divide County, North Dakota, United States.

Notes

Unincorporated communities in Divide County, North Dakota
Unincorporated communities in North Dakota